Overbrook Junction is a station on the Beechview branch of the Port Authority of Allegheny County's light rail network which serves Castle Shannon, Pennsylvania.

History
Overbrook Junction was built as part of the 2004 reopening of the Overbrook line. It is the transfer point between the Beechview (serving Castle Shannon, Mt. Lebanon, Dormont, and Beechview) and Overbrook (serving Overbrook, Carrick, Bon Air, and Belzhoover) lines. No parking is available at the site.  Since park and ride commuters can more conveniently reach the nearby Castle Shannon station, Overbook Junction almost exclusively serves nearby apartments and individuals switching trains. During peak hours, Red Line trains used to terminate at this station, requiring commuters who need to travel farther south to use the short footpath to Willow.

References

Port Authority of Allegheny County stations
Railway stations in the United States opened in 2004
Red Line (Pittsburgh)